Lindsey Haun (born November 21, 1984) is an American actress, singer, and director. She is known for her role as Hadley on the HBO television series True Blood. She was nominated for a Young Artist Award for her role in the 2000 Disney Channel original movie The Color of Friendship as Mahree Bok, and has starred in the film Broken Bridges, for which she also recorded a portion of the soundtrack.

Early life 
Lindsey Haun was born on November 21, 1984. She is the daughter of Jimmy Haun, a guitarist who has recorded with the bands Yes and Circa. Through him, she is also the granddaughter of singer Rouvaun (Jim Haun). Her mother was a choreographer.

Career 
Haun started acting when she was three, in a commercial for Little Caesars. Her first television appearance was on an episode of Anything But Love, and her first notable film role was as Mara, the ruthless leader of the sinister children in 1995's Village of the Damned.

Haun also starred in the Emmy-winning Disney Channel original movie, The Color of Friendship in 2000, which was based on a true story; from there she continued her relationship with Disney as one of the Movie Surfers. She later appeared in ABC Family's Brave New Girl, a television film based on the book co-written by Britney Spears.

In 2006, she starred in the movie Broken Bridges with Toby Keith, and was also signed to his record label, Show Dog Nashville, to be their first "cross-over" artist. Haun is also featured on the movie's soundtrack.

That year, Haun also co-starred in the movie Rome and Jewel, a movie based on William Shakespeare's Romeo and Juliet, but set in Los Angeles and involving an interracial romance.

Haun is also a director of short films including a film which won Fearless Filmmaking Grand Prize in Slamdance Film Festival and another one starring Amanda Fuller.

Filmography

Film

Television

Other works

Discography

Singles

Music videos

References

External links 
 
 Lindsey Haun on Myspace (Haun Solo Project)

1984 births
Actresses from Los Angeles
American child actresses
American country singer-songwriters
American women country singers
Living people
Show Dog-Universal Music artists
Singers from Los Angeles
20th-century American actresses
21st-century American actresses
21st-century American singers
21st-century American women singers
Country musicians from California
Singer-songwriters from California